Daniel Alvarado (12 August 1949 – 8 July 2020) was a Venezuelan actor.

Personal life 
He was married three times. He had two sons, Daniel and Luis, from his first marriage. From second marriage with Carmen Julia Álvarez (1978–1994), he had a daughter Daniela and son Carlos Daniel. From his third marriage with Emma Rabbe (1998–2020), he had three sons, Daniel Alejandro, Diego José and Calvin Daniel.

Alvarado died at the age of 70 on 8 July 2020 after falling from steps in his home and hitting his head. His death was announced the same day on social media by Daniela.

Filmography

Film
Los Padrinos (1973)
Cangrejo II (1984)
Una noche oriental (1986) - Pirela
La matanza de Santa Bárbara (1986)
De mujer a mujer (From Woman to Woman) (1987) - Eloy, the husband
Macu, la mujer del policía (Macu, the Policeman's Woman) (1987) - Ismaelito
Eroi dell'inferno (Hell's Heroes) (1987) - Major Deng
Con el corazón en la mano (1988) - Gato
El Secreto (The Secret) (1988) - Comandante Durán León
El Compromiso (1988) - Vecino Gay
L'Aventure extraordinaire d'un papa peu ordinaire (Extraordinary Adventure of an Ordinary Papa) (1989) - Le général
Cuerpos perdidos (Corps perdus) (1989)
Disparen a matar (Shoot to Kill) (1990) - Castro Gil
Río Negro (Black River) (1991) - Ricardo Osuña
De amor y de sombras (Of Love and Shadows) (1994) - Freedom Fighter
Desnudo con naranjas (Naked with Oranges) (1996) - Capitain
Macbeth-Sangrador (Bleeder) (2000) - Max (Maximiliano)
Antigua vida mía (Antigua, My Life) (2001) - Comentarista Radio #1
Wayuu: La niña de Maracaibo (Wayuu: the girl from Maracaibo) (2011) - Gamero / Francisco
Hijos De La Tierra(  TBA)

TV series 
La Fiera (1978) - Dimas
La Fruta Amarga (1981) - Tanislo
La Mujer Sin Rostro (1984) - Padre Ezequiel
La Dueña (1984) - Capt. Mauricio Lofriego
Doña Perfecta (1985)
Alba Marina (1988) - Nelson Hurtado
La Revancha (1989) - Reinaldo
Bellisima (1991) - Arturo
Rosangelica (1993) - Joel Cruz
Peligrosa (1994) - Gavilán
Morelia (1995)
Pecado de Amor (1996) - Isaías Peña
El Perdon de los Pecados (1996) - Calixto Martínez
Samantha (1998) - Arcadio 'Maute' Guanipa
Toda Mujer (1999) - Néstor Cordido
Amantes de Luna Llena (2000-2001) - Antonio Calcaño (Tony)
Guerra de Mujeres (2001) - Juan Manuel Boni
Mambo y Canela (2002) - Kiko León 'Magallanes'
Mi Gorda Bella (2002) - José Manuel Sevilla
Cosita Rica (El Barrio República) (2003)
Amor Real (2003) - Lisandro Fonseca
Mujer con pantalones (2006) - Pedro Pablo Torrealba
Por Todo lo Alto (2006) - Bienvenido Alegría
Mi Prima Ciela (2007) - Alberto Zambrano
Calle luna, Calle sol (2009) - Juan José Pérez
Dulce Amargo (2012) - Benito Montilla
La Virgen de la Calle (2014) - Ernesto Molina (final appearance)

Mini-series
ADDA (1990)

References

External links

Daniel Alvarado in VenCOR

Male actors of Mexican descent
People from Maracaibo
Venezuelan male actors
1949 births
2020 deaths
Venezuelan people of Mexican descent